The National Scholastic Indoor Championships or "NSIC" are, along with Nike Indoor Nationals, one of two American high school national championship indoor track and field meets. High school participants from across the country compete for the honor of being named NSIC high school All-America. The championships are hosted at the New Balance Track and Field Center at the Fort Washington Avenue Armory in New York City, NY, USA.

Running Events
In its most recent iteration, the following running events were contested at the championships:
 60m Dash
 60m Hurdles
 200m Dash
 400m Dash
 800m Run
 One Mile Run
 Two Mile Run
 5000m Run
 One Mile Race Walk
 Freshman Mile Run
 7-8th Grader 400m Run
 7-8th Grader One Mile Run

Relays
The following relays were also contested:
 4 × 200 m Relay
 4 × 400 m Relay
 4 × 800 m Relay
 4 × Mile Relay
 Sprint Medley Relay
 Distance Medley Relay
 Shuttle Hurdles Relay

Field Events
The following field events were contested at the most recent iteration of the NSIC:
 High Jump
 Long Jump
 Triple Jump
 Pole Vault
 Shot Put
 Weight Throw
 Indoor Pentathlon

References

High school sports in the United States
High school sports in New York (state)
United States athletics (track and field) championships
National indoor athletics competitions